Julian Howard Gibbs (June 24, 1924 – February 20, 1983) was an American educator and the fifteenth President of Amherst College.

Gibbs graduated from Amherst College in 1947.  He earned his master’s and Ph.D. degrees in 1949 and 1950 from Princeton University. After a year of postdoctoral study at Cambridge University in England with a Fulbright Fellowship, he briefly taught at the University of Minnesota. Gibbs then worked for eight years at General Electric Company and American Viscose Corporation before accepting a position at Brown University in 1960 as associate professor of chemistry. He was named a full professor in 1963 and served as the chairman of the Chemistry Department at Brown from 1964 to 1972. In 1967 he won the High Polymer Prize of the American Physical Society. He succeeded John William Ward in 1979 as President of Amherst College and served as president for five years until his death in 1983 due to a heart attack. He continued his chemical research while he was president. The Archives and Special Collections at Amherst College holds a collection of his papers.

References

External links
Julian H. Gibbs Papers, Amherst College Archives and Special Collections

Amherst College alumni
1924 births
1983 deaths
Presidents of Amherst College
Place of death missing
Place of birth missing
Brown University faculty
Princeton University alumni
20th-century American academics